The term Miners Welfare appears in the name of several association football clubs:

England
 Blackwell Miners Welfare F.C.
 Calverton Miners Welfare F.C.
 Gedling Miners Welfare F.C.
 Hemsworth Miners Welfare F.C.
 Holbrook Miners Welfare F.C.
 Nostell Miners Welfare F.C.
 Rainworth Miners Welfare F.C.
 Staveley Miners Welfare F.C.

Scotland
 Lochore Miners Welfare F.C.